Yevhen Zyukov (born 31 May 1978) is a Ukrainian sprinter who competed in the 2000 Summer Olympics and in the 2004 Summer Olympics.

References

1978 births
Living people
Ukrainian male sprinters
Olympic athletes of Ukraine
Athletes (track and field) at the 2000 Summer Olympics
Athletes (track and field) at the 2004 Summer Olympics
Universiade medalists in athletics (track and field)
Universiade gold medalists for Ukraine
Medalists at the 2001 Summer Universiade